Leena Kaarna (born 26 November 1939) is a Finnish athlete. She competed in the women's high jump at the 1964 Summer Olympics.

References

External links
 

1939 births
Living people
Athletes (track and field) at the 1964 Summer Olympics
Finnish female high jumpers
Olympic athletes of Finland
Sportspeople from South Karelia